Timothy Grant Vogel, born 11 July 1960, is a former New Zealand cricketer who played four first-class and three List A cricket matches for Wellington in the 1980s. He also played for Hutt Valley in the Hawke Cup. He was born in Upper Hutt.

References

1960 births
Living people
Sportspeople from Upper Hutt
New Zealand cricketers
Wellington cricketers